Nelson Rugby Union was founded in New Zealand in 1885 and played provincial rugby till 1967 when it merged with the Golden Bay-Motueka Rugby Union to create Nelson-Bays.

Nelson in Ranfurly Shield
In the history of the Nelson Rugby Union, Nelson has contested the Ranfurly Shield twice:
1924: vs Hawkes Bay 3-35, Hastings
1959: vs Taranaki 14–31, New Plymouth

References
Ranfurly Shield at scrum.co.nz
 Lindsay Knight, The Shield: A Century of the Ranfurly Shield, Celebrity Books (2002)  

Defunct New Zealand rugby union teams
Defunct New Zealand rugby union governing bodies
Sport in the Nelson Region
1885 establishments in New Zealand